The 1935 Alabama Crimson Tide football team (variously "Alabama", "UA" or "Bama") represented the University of Alabama in the 1935 college football season. It was the Crimson Tide's 42nd overall and 3rd season as a member of the Southeastern Conference (SEC). The team was led by head coach Frank Thomas, in his fifth year, and played their home games at Denny Stadium in Tuscaloosa and Legion Field in Birmingham, Alabama. They finished the season with a record of six wins, two losses and one tie (6–2–1 overall, 4–2–0 in the SEC).

After Alabama opened the season with an "upset" tie against Howard, Alabama shutout George Washington at Griffith Stadium. One week later, the Crimson Tide suffered their first defeat since 1933 against Mississippi State at Denny Stadium which was also both their first SEC and loss at Denny Stadium. Following this defeat, Alabama responded with five consecutive victories over Tennessee, Georgia, Kentucky, Clemson on homecoming and Georgia Tech before they lost to Vanderbilt to close the season.

For his performance during the season, Riley Smith was a consensus selection to the 1935 College Football All-America Team. In February 1936 Smith, Bear Bryant and Kavanaugh Francis became the first Crimson Tide players selected in the NFL Draft.

Schedule

Game summaries

Howard

Source:

To open the 1935 season Alabama was almost upset by Howard College (now Samford University), but escaped with a 7–7 tie at Denny Stadium. After a scoreless first, Alabama took a 7–0 halftime lead after James Angelich scored on an eight-yard touchdown run. The Bulldogs' defense continued to hold Alabama's offense in check for the remainder of the game, and in the fourth quarter, Howard tied the game. The touchdown was made on a 32-yard Ewing Harbin pass to Dan Snell late in the game. The tie marked the first time Alabama had not won since their loss at Fordham in 1933 and their first in an opening game since their loss at Vanderbilt to open the 1903 season. The tie brought Alabama's all-time record against Howard to 13–0–1.

George Washington

Source:

In what was the first road game of the season, Alabama shutout the George Washington Colonials 39–0 at Griffith Stadium. Riley Smith scored the first Crimson Tide touchdown in the first quarter on a four-yard run to cap a 92-yard drive. Joe Riley scored later in the quarter on a 70-yard punt return to give Alabama a 13–0 lead at the end of the first. In the second, the Crimson Tide scored on a four-yard reverse by James Nesbet for a 19–0 halftime lead. After Nesbet scored a touchdown on a five-yard run in the third, Alabama closed the game with a pair of Clarence Rohrdanz touchdown runs in the fourth quarter for the 39–0 victory. The win improved Alabama's all-time record against George Washington to 2–0.

Mississippi State

Source:

Against their long-time rival, the Mississippi State Maroons, Alabama lost 20–7 at Denny Stadium. The loss was Alabama's first defeat against State since 1914, their first all-time SEC loss and their first all-time loss at Denny Stadium. The Maroons took a 13–0 lead in the first quarter after a pair of Charles Armstrong touchdown passes, first to Ike Pickle and then to Robert Thames. They then extended their lead to 20–0 by halftime after two-yard Pickle touchdown run in the second. In the third, Alabama scored their only touchdown after James Whatley blocked a Pickle punt that was returned twelve-yards by James Walker. The loss brought Alabama's all-time record against Mississippi State 17–5–2.

Tennessee

Source:

Against rival Tennessee, Alabama defeated the Volunteers, 25–0 at Shields-Watkins Field and scored one touchdown in each of the four quarters in their victory. Riley Smith scored in the first on a four-yard run and in the second on a Joe Riley run for a 12–0 halftime lead. Both Riley and Smoth scored touchdowns in the third and fourth quarters respectively for the 25–0 victory. The game was also notable for the performance of Bear Bryant at end, as he competed in the game in spite of having a fractured fibula in his right leg, incurred the week before against Mississippi State. The victory improved Alabama's all-time record against Tennessee 12–5–1.

Georgia

Source:

Against Georgia, Alabama defeated the Bulldogs 17–7 before a homecoming crowd of 25,000 at Sanford Stadium. The Bulldogs took a 7–0 first quarter lead after John Bond threw a 43-yard touchdown pass to Al Minot. Alabama responded in the second with a two-yard Young Boozer touchdown run to make the halftime score 7–7. After a scoreless third, in the fourth the Crimson Tide took a 10–7 lead on a 14-yard Riley Smith field goal. Smith then scored the final points of the game later in the quarter with his one-yard touchdown run. The victory improved Alabama's all-time record against Georgia to 13–11–3.

Kentucky

Source:

In their first game at Legion Field of the season, Alabama defeated the Kentucky Wildcats 13–0 in Birmingham. James Nesbet scored in the first on a four-yard run and Joe Kilgrow threw a 21-yard touchdown pass to James Walker in the third for the 13–0 victory. The victory improved Alabama's all-time record against Kentucky 14–1.

Clemson

Source:

On homecoming at Denny Stadium, Alabama defeated the Clemson Tigers of the Southern Conference 33–0 in Tuscaloosa. After a scoreless first, the Crimson Tide scored a pair of touchdowns in the second. The first was on a Riley Smith quarterback sneak and the second on a seven-yard James Walker run. Alabama extended their lead further to 26–0 by the end of the third period with touchdowns scored by James Walker on a one-yard run and by James Angelich on a short run. They then closed the game with their fifth touchdown of the afternoon on a 30-yard Red Keller touchdown reception. The victory improved Alabama's all-time record against Clemson to 5–3.

Georgia Tech

Source:

Against the Georgia Tech, Alabama defeated the Yellow Jackets 38–7 at Legion Field. Alabama took a 6–0 first quarter lead after James Angelich scored on a touchdown run. In the second quarter, both teams traded touchdowns on a Riley Smith quarterback sneak and a Clarence Rohrdanz run for Alabama and on a 37-yard E. H. Gibson reception and lateral pass to E. R. Collins. Up 19–7 at the half, Alabama closed the game with 19 unanswered second half points. Bear Bryant scored on a run in the third and on a pair of Joe Kilgrow touchdown runs in the fourth. The victory improved Alabama's all-time record against Georgia Tech to 9–10–2.

Vanderbilt

Source:

In the season finale on Thanksgiving Day, Alabama lost to the Vanderbilt Commodores for the first time since 1929 with their 14–6 defeat at Dudley Field. After a scoreless first, Vanderbilt took a 7–0 halftime lead after Paul Dixon scored on a three-yard touchdown run. Alabama responded in the third with a 51-yard Riley Smith touchdown pass to James Walker, however a failed extra point kept the Commodores in the lead 7–6. Byron Beard scored the final points of the game after he recovered a fumbled punt by Joe Riley in the endzone for a touchdown. The loss brought Alabama's all-time record against Vanderbilt to 7–9.

After the season

Awards
After the season, Riley Smith was selected by consensus to the 1935 College Football All-America Team as a quarterback.

NFL Draft
Several players that were varsity lettermen from the 1935 squad were drafted into the National Football League (NFL) between the 1936 and 1938 drafts. These players included the following:

Personnel

Varsity letter winners

Coaching staff

References
General

 

Specific

Alabama
Alabama Crimson Tide football seasons
Alabama Crimson Tide football